Hokejový Klub Dukla Trenčín is a professional Slovak ice hockey club based in Trenčín, playing in the Slovak Extraliga. The club has won three Slovak league championships (1994, 1997, 2004) and one Czechoslovak league championship (1992). The team is nicknamed Vojaci, meaning "Soldiers" in English.

History

Czechoslovak era
The club was founded on 19 January 1962, relocating army hockey club from Opava to Trenčín. They were members of inaugural season (1963–64) of the 1. SNHL (1st. Slovak National Hockey League). They won the 1965–66 1. SNHL season and promoted to the preliminary round for the Czechoslovak First Ice Hockey League. There they lost 5 of 6 games against VŽKG Ostrava, VTŽ Chomutov and Spartak Motorlet Praha and did not promote to the First League. Dukla won the 1. SNHL again in 1967–68, 1970–71 and 1976–77. In 1976–77 they were first time successful in the preliminary round and first time in the club history they promoted to the Czechoslovak First Ice Hockey League. Dukla was placed 11th in their first season at the Top level. After five seasons they was relegated from the Top level in the 1981–82 season. However, in the next season they won 1. SNHL and in the preliminary round defeated Olomouc and promoted to the Top level again. They was placed 6th after their comeback in the 1983–84 season. In 1985–86 there was introduced playoffs tournament in the Czechoslovak Extraliga. Dukla advanced to the playoffs in 1985–86 and there they lost 1–3 against Tesla Pardubice in the quarterfinals. They advanced to the playoffs again in 1987–88 and there they lost 1–3 in the quarterfinals against their Slovak rival VSŽ Košice. Dukla progressed to the finals against Tesla Pardubice in the 1988–89 season. There they lost 1–3. In the next season they progressed to the finals again where they lost 1–3 against HC Sparta Praha. In 1990–91 Dukla lost in the semifinals against Litvínov but they won the bronze medals against VSŽ Košice. The most successful season in the club history is the 1991–92 season when Dukla won the Czechoslovak Extraliga first time. In the quarterfinals they defeated Poldi Kladno 3–2, in the semifinals defeated Litvínov 3–1 and in the finals they won 3–1 against Škoda Plzeň. Žigmund Pálffy was scoring leader of Dukla in the regular season (48 Pts) and in the playoffs (26 Pts). Róbert Švehla, defenceman of Dukla, won the Golden Hockey Stick in the same season. In the last season before split Czechoslovakia Dukla won the bronze medals.

Slovak era
After dissolution of Czechoslovakia in 1993, Dukla began playing independent new Slovak Championship which was named the Slovak Extraliga. Dukla and HC Košice were playoffs finalists in first 4 seasons of the Slovak Extraliga. Dukla won the first Extraliga season in 1993–94, then they lost in the finals in two next seasons and won again in 1996–97. In the 1997–98 season Dukla was eliminated in the semifinals by HC Slovan Bratislava.
In the 2000–01 season they played again in the playoffs finals. There they lost 1–3 against HKm Zvolen. Zvolen was opponent in the playoffs finals again in the 2003–04 season. Dukla won 4–2 in the finals and they won third Slovak title in their history. During the 2004–05 NHL lockout several former Dukla players came back to Trenčín, including Pavol Demitra, Marián Hossa and Marián Gáborík. Pavol Demitra played complete regular season and he was a scoring leader of the Extraliga (82 Pts). Despite a star lineup Dukla lost 3–4 in the excited semifinals against HC Slovan Bratislava. In the 2006–07 season Dukla played in the final series against HC Slovan Bratislava but lost 0–4. In the 2009–10 season Dukla did not qualify for the playoffs for the first time since the 1986–87 season.

NHL alumni
After the fall of the Iron Curtain many players who were born in Trenčín or started their youth career in Dukla youth system had success in the NHL. Marián Gáborík, Marián Hossa and Zdeno Chára are the most successful players who were born in Trenčín. Gáborík was drafted 3rd overall by Minnesota Wild in the 2000 NHL Entry Draft, becoming the first signed player in the club history. Gáborík's teammate in Minnesota Wild was Ľubomír Sekeráš who played three seasons for the club. Chára, drafted 56th overall by New York Islanders in 1996, is the first Slovak and only the second European captain of an NHL team who won the Stanley Cup. Chára is also the first Slovak winner of the James Norris Memorial Trophy, given to the best defenseman of a season. Richard Lintner was drafted in the same year as Chára, another NHL player who was born in Trenčín. Marián Hossa won Stanley Cup three times with Chicago Blackhawks. The stadium in Trenčín was named after Pavol Demitra who died in the 2011 Lokomotiv Yaroslavl plane crash.

Honours

Domestic

Slovak Extraliga
  Winners (3): 1993–94, 1996–97, 2003–04
  Runners-up (5): 1994–95, 1995–96, 2000–01, 2006–07, 2017–18
  3rd place (3): 1999–2000, 2004–05, 2011–12

Czechoslovak Extraliga
  Winners (1): 1991–92
  Runners-up (2): 1988–89, 1989–90
  3rd place (2): 1990–91, 1992–93

1st. Slovak National Hockey League
  Winners (5): 1965–66, 1967–68, 1970–71, 1976–77, 1982–83
  Runners-up (3): 1964–65, 1971–72, 1974–75
  3rd place (3): 1963–64, 1966–67, 1969–70

Pre-season
Rona Cup
  Winners (4): 1994, 2002, 2003, 2007

Tatra Cup
  Winners (2): 1985, 1996

Players

Current roster

Retired numbers

Notable players

 Jerguš Bača
 Josef Beránek
 Ernest Bokroš
 Mojmír Božík
 Zdeno Chára
 Zdeno Cíger
 Jozef Daňo
 Pavol Demitra
 Marián Gáborík
 Leo Gudas
 Eduard Hartmann
 Oto Haščák
 Radoslav Hecl
 Ivan Hlinka
 Miroslav Hlinka
 Miloš Holaň
 Marián Hossa
 Marcel Hossa
 Jiří Hrdina
 Branislav Jánoš
 Tomáš Jelínek
 Tomáš Kapusta
 Ľubomír Kolník
 Roman Kontšek
 Tomáš Kopecký
 Ján Lašák
 Richard Lintner
 Miroslav Marcinko
 Stanislav Medřík
 Andrej Meszároš
 Branislav Mezei
 Michel Miklík
 Igor Murín
 Milan Nedoma
 Andrej Nedorost
 Žigmund Pálffy
 Ján Pardavý
 Rastislav Pavlikovský
 Róbert Petrovický
 Branko Radivojevič
 Radim Raděvič
 Pavel Richter
 Vladimír Růžička
 Miroslav Šatan
 Andrej Sekera
 Ľubomír Sekeráš
 Peter Slanina
 Marián Smerčiak
 Roman Stantien
 Tomáš Starosta
 Antonín Stavjaňa
 Jozef Stümpel
 Roman Šimíček
 Róbert Švehla
 Tomáš Tatar

References

External links
Official website 

Trenčín
Trencin, Dukla
Trencin, Dukla
Ice hockey clubs established in 1962
1962 establishments in Czechoslovakia
Sport in Trenčín Region